Waleran III of Luxembourg (1355 – 12 April 1415) Count of Ligny and Saint Pol, was a French nobleman and soldier.

Life 
Waleran was the son of Guy of Luxembourg and  Mahaut of Châtillon. His name originates from the fact that he was a 5th generation descendant of Henry V, Count of Luxembourg, and thus belonged to the french branch of the House of Luxembourg. 

Waleran succeeded his father in 1371, after his death at the Battle of Baesweiler. Waleran was captured at the same battle, but released through the intercession of Charles IV, Holy Roman Emperor. In 1374, he was captured by the English before Ardres and sent to Windsor as a prisoner. The English attempted to exchange him for Jean III de Grailly, captal de Buch, but without success. In 1380, while a captive, he married Maud Holland (d. 1392), daughter of Thomas Holland, 1st Earl of Kent and Joan of Kent and stepdaughter of Edward, the Black Prince. This allowed him to negotiate down his ransom, and he was released soon afterwards. 

After Maud's death, he married Bona of Bar (d. 1400), daughter of Duke Robert of Bar and Marie of Valois (daughter of John II of France), but they had no children. He was one of the peace commissioners sent to London in 1396, and made a futile attack on the English at Mercq near Calais in 1405. 
He was of the party of Philip II, Duke of Burgundy, marrying his daughter to Philip's son Antoine. Under the Burgundians he obtained preferment, becoming Grand Maître des Eaux et Forêts, the governor of Paris in 1410, and Constable of France in 1411. However, he lost the Constableship and was driven from Paris with the rest of the Burgundians in 1413. He died in 1415 and was succeeded by his grandson Philip of Saint-Pol.

Marriage and issue
Waleran and Maud had:
Jeanne (d. 1407), who married Antoine, Duke of Brabant in 1401.

By his mistress, Agnes de Brie, Waleran had:
John, bastard of St. Pol, called Hennequin, lord of Hautbordin.(d.1466)

Ancestors

References

Sources

1355 births
1415 deaths
14th-century French people
15th-century French people
Luxembourg, Waleram 03 of
Luxembourg, Waleram 03 of
Luxembourg, Waleram 03 of
Military governors of Paris
French people of Luxembourgian descent